Carle Place Middle/High School is a six-year comprehensive public high school located in the hamlet of Carle Place in the Town of North Hempstead, Nassau County, New York.

As of the 2016–17 school year, the school had an enrollment of 652 students and 71.05 classroom teachers (on an FTE basis), for a student–teacher ratio of 9.18:1. There were 107 students (16.4% of enrollment) eligible for free lunch and 16 (2.5% of students) eligible for reduced-cost lunch.

Sister schools
Carle Place High School had a sister school in Filabusi, Matabeleland South Province, Zimbabwe, named Singwango Secondary School, and still donates sports equipment (e.g., old uniforms).

Carle Place High School's current sister school is Guwe Secondary School, Zimbabwe. The school still donates what is mentioned above.

Notable alumni

 Tom Cipullo – Composer. His works include 225 published songs, and the critically acclaimed opera, Glory Denied.
Matt Snell – Former pro football player for the New York Jets.
 Joe Satriani – Guitar virtuoso and instrumentalist. Lead guitarist for Chickenfoot. Played with Deep Purple and Mick Jagger.
 Steve Vai – Another guitar virtuoso who was one of Joe Satriani's students, with many solo albums to his credit, and other collaborations/appearances - including Frank Zappa, Public Image Limited, David Lee Roth, and Whitesnake.
 Charles J. Fuschillo Jr. – Former Republican member of the New York State Senate and President and CEO of the Alzheimer's Foundation of America.
 Dawn Johnsen – Lawyer and professor of constitutional law.
 Myles Brand – Former president of the NCAA.
 Brendan Hay – Hollywood executive and creator.
 Billy Miller – Rock 'n roll musician and archivist.
 Steve Serio - Paralympic Gold Medal winning Wheelchair Basketball player.

References

Public high schools in New York (state)
Town of North Hempstead, New York
Schools in Nassau County, New York
Public middle schools in New York (state)
Educational institutions established in 1955
1955 establishments in New York (state)